Geoffrey Lazarus "Geoff" Selby  (11 April 1965 – 13 February 1989) was an Australian rugby league footballer who played in the 1980s.

Career
Geoff Selby was of Jewish descent. He was a promising junior player at James Cook High School at Kogarah, New South Wales, and on the recommendation of his teacher, Brian Smith he joined the Illawarra Steelers for two seasons in 1984–1985. Geoff Selby was also a member of the 1983 Australian Schoolboys Team.

Selby then moved to the St. George Dragons. A promising Lock forward, Selby was held in such high esteem, he came under the personal guidance of the legendary Johnny Raper. With a promising career in front of him, the community was deeply saddened by Selby's premature death just before the start of the 1989 NSWRL season.

Death

Geoff Selby was killed in a car accident on 13 February 1989 when a car he was traveling in hit a tree on Burraneer Bay Road, Cronulla at 2.30am. Selby was not the driver. Two other St. George Dragons players, Peter Gentle and Shaun O'Bryan were also injured  in the same accident. He was cremated at Northern Suburbs Crematorium on 16 February 1989, and his wake was held at St. George Leagues Club.

Accolades

Geoff Selby was a reserve for the St. George Dragons side that won the 1988 Panasonic Cup. 

The St. George Illawarra Dragons recognize annually the "Geoff Selby Memorial Coach's Award" to the player who is the most valuable during the season, as a memorial to the memory of Geoff Selby.

References

1965 births
1989 deaths
Australian people of Jewish descent
St. George Dragons players
Illawarra Steelers players
Australian rugby league players
Salford Red Devils players
Road incident deaths in New South Wales
Rugby league locks
Rugby league players from Sydney